The Conchi viaduct, or Loa viaduct, is located on the Loa River in Chile,  from Calama. It was built to carry part of the Ferrocarril de Antofagasta a Bolivia (Antofagasta & Bolivia Railway). When opened in 1888 and it was the second highest rail bridge in the world, after the Garabit viaduct.

In 1914, the railway was realigned. Today, the bridge carries only pipes and a cordoned-off road.

On June 3, 2015, it was declared a National Monument, in the category of Historical Monument, by Decree 156 of the Ministry of Education, published in the Chilean Official Journal.

References

External links

 Loa Viaduct on the website HighestBridges.com (English)
 The Conchi Viaduct

Beam bridges
Iron bridges
Trestle bridges
Railway bridges in Chile
Viaducts
National Monuments of Chile
Buildings and structures in Antofagasta Region